Trachylepis rodenburgi, also known commonly as Rodenburg's mabuya, is a species of skink, a lizard in the family Scincidae. The species is endemic to West Africa.

Etymology
The specific name, rodenburgi, is in honor of the collector of the holotype, Willem F. Rodenburg.

Geographic range
T. rodenburgi is found in Ghana and Nigeria.

Habitat
The natural habitat of T. rodenburgi is rocky areas.

Reproduction
The mode of reproduction of T. rodenburgi is unknown.

References

Further reading
Bauer AM (2003). "On the identity of Lacerta punctata Linnaeus, 1758, the type species of the genus Euprepis Wagler, 1830, and the generic assignment of Afro-Malagasy skinks". African Journal of Herpetology 52: 1–7. (Trachylepis rodenburgi, new combination).
Hoogmoed MS (1974). "Ghanese lizards of the genus Mabuya (Scincidae, Sauria, Reptilia)". Zoologische Verhandelingen 138: 1-62. (Mabuya rodenburgi, new species, pp. 51–57, Figure 14).
Trape J-F, Trape S, Chirio L (2012). Lézards, crocodiles et tortues d'Afrique occidentale et du Sahara. Paris: IRD Orstom. 503 pp. . (in French).

Trachylepis
Reptiles of West Africa
Reptiles described in 1974
Taxa named by Marinus Steven Hoogmoed